Elections to the Ettrick and Lauderdale District Council took place in May 1988, alongside elections to the councils of Scotland's various other districts. The number of seats and the total vote share won by each party is listed below.

References

Ettrick and Lauderdale District Council elections
1988 Scottish local elections